Hilarographa odontia is a species of moth of the family Tortricidae. It is found in the Cordillera Occidental of Colombia.

The wingspan is about 25 mm. The forewings are bronzy with some orange dots followed by a broad terminal area marked with two black spots. The hindwings are brown with an orange admixture, especially in the anterior half of the wing.

Etymology
The specific name refers to the thorny end of aedeagus and is derived from Greek odus.

References

Moths described in 2011
Hilarographini